Voxpro is a corporate multinational provider of outsourced multilingual customer service and technical support services for international brands.  It is the largest in its industry in Ireland or the UK.

History 
Voxpro was founded in 1999 by husband and wife team Dan and Linda Kiely. Since its inception its headquarters have been in Cork, Ireland, over a Marlboro Street public house. It also has offices in Dublin, Sacramento, San Francisco and Bucharest. The initial team was six people but employment expansion occurred fast. It focuses on customer service – but for companies that fit with its vision.

In August 2017, TELUS International acquired a 55pc stake in the company, which then operated as ‘Voxpro – powered by TELUS International’.

As of December 2019, TELUS International acquired the remaining 45pc in fast-growing Cork-based business process outsourcing company Voxpro that it did not already own.

Notable clients
Today Voxpro's clients include: Airbnb, Google, Nestlabs.

Further development
Voxpro more than trebled its US workforce after announcing 450 positions at its base in California. According to Jon Ward, General Manager of Voxpro US, “Voxpro’s North American expansion is in full swing with the imminent announcement of another new site. Our announcement today of 450 additional roles in Folsom will ensure sufficient highly trained individuals are in position for our continued expansion. We are also looking to the east coast where we will open a sales and marketing office in New York later this year, together with an east coast centre of excellence.”

The firm’s plans comprise a ‘futuristic call centre with 750 jobs, and a lot of open space, mirroring Google’s design. In terms of its likeness to Google, Voxpro’s Managing Director Aidan O’Shea  claimed that it is “similar, but different.” O’Shea believes the firm has a very clear picture on its targeted industries in the future.  The firm has no intention for example, on focusing on banks, utility or telecommunications companies.   Rather, it is looking into the financial services industry.  He also claims that it is a place young people want to work at and has a very different feel to other standard outsourcing firms.  As such Voxpro looks for a certain type of employee.

CEO Kiely said that an initial public offering will be a viable option once revenue hits around €100m.

Awards and acclaim
According to an article in Biz Journals, “Voxpro has made waves in Europe with an approach to business that focuses on mirroring the culture of its clients within its service centers, and this approach is readily apparent upon entering the new office.”

In 2013, Voxpro won the High Growth Company award at the it@Cork Leaders Awards. In 2014, the Cork Chamber/ Vodafone Company of the Year award, as well as the 2013/2014 Deloitte Best Managed Companies Award. Both Kielys were named MSL Cork Business People of the Year in October 2013 and in the same year, Linda won the Entrepreneur of the Year at the IMAGE Businesswoman of the Year awards 2013.

In 2015, Voxpro received the Grand Prix Award at the eir Elevation Fast Company Awards 2015, for “ingenuity and economic growth potential of businesses across Ireland. In 2016 Voxpro was named as one of Ireland’s ‘Best Managed’ companies in the Deloitte Best Managed Companies Awards Programme. This award recognizes indigenous firms in Ireland “operating at the highest levels of business performance.”

References

Information technology consulting firms of Ireland
Customer communications management
Technology companies established in 1999
1999 establishments in Ireland